The term netizen is a portmanteau of the English words internet and citizen, as in a "citizen of the net" or "net citizen". It describes a person actively involved in online communities or the Internet in general.

The term commonly also implies an interest and active engagement in improving the internet, making it an intellectual and a social resource, or its surrounding political structures, especially in regard to open access, net neutrality and free speech. The term was widely adopted in the mid-1990s as a way to describe those who inhabit the new geography of the internet. Internet pioneer and author Michael F. Hauben is credited with coining and popularizing the term.

Determining factor
In general, any individual who has access to the internet has the potential to be classified as a netizen. In the 21st century, this is made possible by the global connectivity of the internet. People can physically be located in one country but connected most of the world via a global network.

There is a clear distinction between netizens and people who come online to use the internet. A netizen is described as an individual who actively seeks to contribute to the development of the internet. Netizens are not individuals who go online for personal gain or profit, but instead actively seeks to make the internet a better place.

A term used to classify internet users who do not actively contribute to the development of the internet is "lurker". Lurkers cannot be classified as netizens, as although they do not actively harm the internet, they do not contribute either.

In China

In Mandarin Chinese, the terms wǎngmín (literally "netizen" or "net folks") and wǎngyǒu (literally "net friend" or "net mate") are commonly used terms meaning "internet users", and the English word netizen is used by mainland China-based English language media to translate both terms, resulting in the frequent appearance of that English word in media reporting about China, far more frequently than the use of the word in other contexts.

Netizen Prize

The international nonprofit organisation Reporters Without Borders awards an annual Netizen Prize in recognition to an internet user, blogger, cyber-dissident, or group who has helped to promote freedom of expression on the internet. The organisation uses the term when describing the political repression of cyber-dissidents such as legal consequences of blogging in politically repressive environments.

Psychological studies
With time, more and more people have started interacting and building communities online. Some communities are so strong, they outsmart offline-communities. The effect it has on human psychology and life is of major interest and concern of researchers. Several studies are being done on netizen under the name Netizens’ Psychology.  Problems are internet addiction, mental health, outrage, and effect on kids' development are some of the many problems netizen psychology tries to focus on.

See also

 Digital citizen – citizens (of the physical space) using the Internet as a tool in order to engage in society, politics, and government participation
 Digital native – a person who has grown up in the information age
 Netiquette – social conventions for online communities
 Cyberspace – the new societal territory that is inhabited by Netizens
 Internet age
 Network society
 Active citizenship – the concept that citizens have certain roles and responsibilities to society and the environment and should actively participate
 Social Age
 List of Internet pioneers – those who helped erect the theoretical and technological foundation of the Internet (instead of improving its content, utility or political aspects)
 Participatory culture – a culture in which the public does not act merely as consumers and voters, but also as contributors, producers and active participants

References

Further reading

External links 
 The Mysterious Netizen

Information society
Information Age
Internet terminology
Internet culture
Social influence
Cyberspace
Virtual communities
Citizenship